The Sutter Street Railway was originally a horsecar line in San Francisco. The railway began service on May 1, 1866 as the Front Street, Mission and Ocean Railroad. Shortly after it had become known as the Sutter Street Railroad. 

In 1877 the line was converted to cable car operation. The line introduced the side grip, and lever operation, both designed by Asa Hovey. Sutter Street Railway's grip car 46 and trailer 54 have been preserved and are displayed in the San Francisco Cable Car Museum.

Sutter Street Railway was part of the amalgamation of companies which formed United Railroads of San Francisco in 1902.

Steam-powered extension 
A Russian gauge extension was built through the Marina District to the Presidio of San Francisco in 1877. Former horsecars were pulled over this line by two 0-4-0 tank locomotives built by Baldwin Locomotive Works (C/N 4121 & 4125). These steam dummy locomotives were named Harbor View and Casebolt. After the extension was sold to the Presidio & Ferries Railway in 1880, these locomotives operated as numbers 1 and 2 until the line was destroyed by the San Francisco earthquake.

See also 
San Francisco cable car system

References 

Cable car railways in the United States
Streetcars in California
Public transportation in San Francisco
Defunct California railroads